North Battleford was a constituency of the Legislative Assembly of Saskatchewan.

Boundaries 
The riding was based around the city of North Battleford.

History 
The constituency was in use (1908–1917).

North Battleford was merged with Battleford into The Battlefords.

Representation

References 

Former provincial electoral districts of Saskatchewan
North Battleford